Huddy may refer to:

 Huddy (surname)
 Huddy, Kentucky
 Huddy Park, a park in Highlands, New Jersey
 Huddy (musician), American social media personality and musician
 Huddy, a neologism for the relationship between House and Cuddy on the television series House
 "Huddy", a 2018 song by American rapper Coi Leray